Frailty is a 2001 psychological thriller film directed by and starring Bill Paxton, and co-starring Matthew McConaughey and Powers Boothe. It marks Paxton's directorial debut. The plot focuses on the strange relationship between two young brothers and their father, who believes that he has been commanded by God to kill demons disguised as people. Released on April 12, 2002, the film received generally positive reviews from critics and grossed $17 million.

Plot
Fenton Meiks visits FBI Agent Wesley Doyle claiming that his brother Adam is the culprit in the "God's Hand" serial killings. Fenton says Adam has committed suicide, prompting Fenton to fulfill a promise to bury his brother in a public rose garden in their hometown of Thurman. He begins to tell Doyle about the boys' childhood and suggests that the bodies of the God's Hand victims are buried in the rose garden.

While children in the summer of 1979, their father told them that he had been visited by an angel and tasked by God with "destroying" demons disguised as human beings; a mission which must be kept secret. Their father "is led" to 3 tools: an axe, gloves and a pipe; he receives a list of names from the angel as well. He incapacitates a woman with the pipe and brings her home to kill with the axe. When he lays his hand on her, he claims to see a vision of her evil, then kills her and makes the boys help him bury her body in the rose garden. Fenton is horrified and believes his father insane; Adam claims he sees the visions and supports their father.

After telling Doyle about the first killing, Doyle drives them to Thurman. On the way, Doyle tells Fenton that his mother had been murdered by someone that was never caught. Fenton then tells Doyle how they took the second victim in broad daylight, with his father insisting God would blind any witnesses. One night, Fenton's father tells him that after praying for the angel to visit Fenton (for his lack of faith) the angel instead visited him, and told him something bad about Fenton. He makes Fenton dig a hole and Fenton abandons all faith in God. Their father makes the hole into a cellar and moves the shed on top of it.

During the third episode, Fenton escapes from the cellar and runs to the sheriff who takes him back home. To quiet Fenton's apparent ramblings, the sheriff looks in the cellar, but finds it empty. As he leaves, their father kills him and is angry with Fenton for making him murder an innocent man. After burying the body, Fenton's father tells him the angel told him Fenton was a demon. To save him and encourage him to have faith, he locks Fenton in the cellar for over a week. Fenton claims to have been enlightened and his father releases him to carry out the next killing.

Fenton cooperates with his father to take the next victim but alerts him just before his father hits the man with the pipe, nearly blowing the scheme. In the cellar, Fenton readies to kill the man with the axe, but kills his father instead. As he tries to release the man, Adam takes up the axe and kills the man after all. While burying the two men, Fenton makes Adam promise to bury him in the garden if Adam ever "destroys" him.

Doyle is puzzled by his phrasing, since he said Adam killed himself. "Fenton" then reveals to Doyle that he is Adam. It is also revealed that Adam killed Fenton, who had grown up to become the actual God's Hand killer (a series of unrelated murders not committed by Adam "destroying" demons; Doyle is horrified to see the number of graves in the rose garden). Flashbacks reveal that Adam did in fact share his father's visions of the crimes of those they abducted, who were indeed demons. When Adam touches Doyle, a vision reveals that Doyle murdered his mother - he was on Adam's list. Adam kills him in a prepared grave as part of a long scheme to get him there.

After Doyle's disappearance, an Agent Griffin Hull, who has previously met with Adam, can't seem to remember his face. The security tapes are also inexplicably obscured by static whenever Adam is in view. The FBI raid Fenton's house, finding the God's Hand list and Doyle's badge, which corroborate his being the killer. Agent Hull visits Adam Meiks, a nearby county sheriff, to tell him Fenton was the killer. Upon shaking his hand, Adam declares the agent a good man.

Cast
Bill Paxton as Dad Meiks, Fenton and Adam's widower father and a serial killer
Matthew McConaughey as Adam Meiks
Powers Boothe as FBI Agent Wesley Doyle
Matt O'Leary as Young Fenton, Adam's brother
Jeremy Sumpter as Young Adam, Fenton's brother
Luke Askew as Sheriff Smalls
Levi Kreis as Fenton Meiks
Derk Cheetwood as Agent Griffin Hull
Missy Crider as Becky Meiks (as Melissa Crider)
Alan Davidson as Brad White
Cynthia Ettinger as Cynthia Harbridge
Vincent Chase as Edward March
Gwen McGee as Operator
Edmond Scott Ratliff as The Angel
Rebecca Tilney as Teacher

Production
In October 2000, it was announced that Lions Gate Films would fully finance Bill Paxton's directorial debut, Frailty. The film at one point had been slated to be produced by Atlantic Streamline, but Atlantic's unwillingness to handle domestic rights in addition to foreign rights resulted in the deal never materializing. At the time, Frailty marked Lions Gate's largest investment in an in-house production.

Reception
Review aggregator website Rotten Tomatoes reported that 75% of 155 critics gave the film a positive review, with an average rating of 6.9/10. The site's critics consensus states: "Creepy and disturbing, Frailty is well-crafted, low-key horror."  Audiences polled by CinemaScore gave the film an average grade of "B−" on an A+ to F scale.

Roger Ebert in particular singled it out for praise, giving the film four out of four stars and declaring that "Frailty is an extraordinary work, concealing in its depths not only unexpected story turns but also implications, hidden at first, that make it even deeper and more sad." 

Bloody Disgusting gave the film an 'Honorable Mention' in their list of the twenty best horror films of the 2000s, calling the film an "underrated gem [...] a small-scale, thought-provoking horror film that deserves a second look."
However, there are negative remarks on the performance, which was criticised by Nell Minow as "a cold reading of the script", while one particular plot that the murders take place in front of the young sons and committed by a beloved father is considered "disturbing" and "an abuse of cinematic power."

Box office
Frailty grossed $13.1 million in the United States and Canada, and $4.3 million in other territories, for a worldwide total of $17.4 million.

See also
Binding of Isaac

References

External links

Frailty at allmovie.com

Frailty at Metacritic
Frailty at Rotten Tomatoes 

2001 directorial debut films
2001 films
2001 horror films
American serial killer films
American supernatural thriller films
Canadian psychological horror films
Canadian horror thriller films
Canadian serial killer films
Canadian supernatural thriller films
Demons in film
English-language Canadian films
Fiction with unreliable narrators
Films critical of religion
Films about dysfunctional families
Films produced by David Kirschner
Films directed by Bill Paxton
Films set in 1979
Films set in Dallas
Films scored by Brian Tyler
Fratricide in fiction
Lionsgate films
Patricide in fiction
Matricide in fiction
Religious horror films
Southern Gothic films
2000s English-language films
2000s American films
2000s Canadian films